Decade is a greatest hits album by Duran Duran, released on 15 November 1989.

The remix single "Burning the Ground" was released to radio to promote this album. It was created by producer John Jones by mixing snippets of the band's biggest hits from the previous decade into a new piece of music. However, the track was not included on the Decade album itself. The tracks "My Own Way" and "New Moon on Monday" were also not included, even though both were top 20 hits in the UK.

Decade's track listing included various hits from all of Duran Duran's albums and presented them in mixes that were popular and mainstream among the public. Hence, it includes the Nile Rodgers edit of "The Reflex" and the single edits of "Hungry Like The Wolf", "Notorious" and "Skin Trade", as well as the Shep Pettibone single mix of "I Don't Want Your Love". Oddly, there are many versions and single edits of the song "Rio"; the compilation uses the standard album version, and for "Save a Prayer" the UK single version.

Track listing

Personnel
 Daniel Abraham – production, engineering, mixing
 Hans Arnold – illustrations
 John Barry – arrangement, conducting
 Jason Corsaro – production, engineering, mixing
 Duran Duran – production
 Bernard Edwards – production
 Jonathan Elias – production
 Laura Levine – photography
 Ian Little – production, mixing
 Denis O'Regan – photography
 Steve Peck – mixing
 Shep Pettibone – production, mixing
 Nile Rodgers – production, mixing
 Bob Rosa – mixing
 Alex Sadkin – production, mixing
 Stephen Sprouse – illustrations
 Colin Thurston – production, engineering

Charts

Weekly charts

Year-end charts

Certifications

References

1989 greatest hits albums
Albums produced by Nile Rodgers
Albums produced by Bernard Edwards
Albums produced by Colin Thurston
Albums produced by Alex Sadkin
Albums produced by Daniel Abraham (record producer)
Albums produced by Jonathan Elias
Duran Duran compilation albums
Capitol Records compilation albums
EMI Records compilation albums